The Archdeacon of Belize is a senior ecclesiastical post within the Anglican Diocese of Belize; and as such is responsible for the disciplinary supervision of the clergy  within its boundaries.

List of archdeacons
 A. R. Swaby
 Frederic Richardson Murray
 George Henry Hogbin
 Ronald Arthur Frederick Pratt
 Gilbert Rodwell Hulse
 Rowland Wilfred Taylor
  Eldon Anthony Sylvester

References

 
Lists of Belizean people
Belize religion-related lists